Salute is the sixteenth original album by Canadian musician Gordon Lightfoot, released in 1983 Warner Brothers Records. It barely registered on the charts (#175) and is one of his least-known recordings. Consequently, songs from the album very rarely feature in Lightfoot's live performances.

The album completed Lightfoot's shift from acoustic folk/country compositions to a more sleek adult contemporary sound, a shift he had begun on Shadows. However, he had never completely abandoned his folk roots, as "Whispers of the North", "Knotty Pine" and "Tattoo" show.

In general, the album was more upbeat than its introspective predecessor with even greater use of electric guitar licks and synthesizers.

Track listing
All compositions by Gordon Lightfoot.

"Salute (A Lot More Livin' to Do)" - 4:24
"Gotta Get Away" - 2:54
"Whispers of the North" - 3:20
"Someone to Believe In" - 3:32
"Romance" - 3:31
"Knotty Pine" - 4:00
"Biscuit City" - 2:55
"Without You" - 3:07
"Tattoo" - 4:28
"Broken Dreams" - 4:05

Personnel
Gordon Lightfoot - vocals, rhythm guitar
Terry Clements - lead guitar
Rick Haynes - bass guitar
Dean Parks - lead guitar, synthesizer
Barry Keane - drums, percussion
Hadley Hockensmith - bass guitar, hi-string bass
Mike Heffernan - piano, electric piano
Pee Wee Charles - steel guitar
Harlan Rodgers - piano
Carol Parks - harmony vocals

References

External links
Album chords and lyrics

1983 albums
Gordon Lightfoot albums
Warner Records albums